Reevesia rotundifolia is a species of flowering plant in the family Malvaceae. It is found only in China. It is threatened by habitat loss.

References

Helicteroideae
Endemic flora of China
Critically endangered plants
Taxonomy articles created by Polbot